Liliana da Silva Cá (born 5 November 1986) is a Portuguese athlete specialising in the discus throw.

Career
Cá won a silver medal at the 2018 Mediterranean Games. She had a five-year break in her career between 2013 and 2018 to raise children.

Her personal best in the event is 66.40 metres set in Leiria in 2021, a national record. On 27 February 2021, Liliana threw 65:10 m in a preparation test in Vagos and got the entry standard for the Tokyo Olympic Games. She holds the Portuguese record for the discus throw in front of Teresa Machado (65.40 m) in 1998 and Irina Rodrigues (63.96 m) in 2016.

Personal life
Born in Portugal, Cá is of Bissau-Guinean descent.

International competitions

References

1986 births
Sportspeople from Barreiro, Portugal
Living people
Portuguese female discus throwers
S.L. Benfica athletes
Mediterranean Games silver medalists for Portugal
Mediterranean Games medalists in athletics
Black Portuguese sportspeople
Athletes (track and field) at the 2018 Mediterranean Games
Athletes (track and field) at the 2020 Summer Olympics
Olympic athletes of Portugal
Athletes (track and field) at the 2022 Mediterranean Games
20th-century Portuguese women
21st-century Portuguese women
World Athletics Championships athletes for Portugal
Portuguese sportspeople of Bissau-Guinean descent